Dry basis is an expression of the calculation in chemistry, chemical engineering and related subjects, in which the presence of water (and/or other solvents) is neglected for the purposes of the calculation. Water (and/or other solvents) is neglected because addition and removal of water (and/or other solvents) are common processing steps, and also happen naturally through evaporation and condensation; it is frequently useful to express compositions on a dry basis to remove these effects.

Example
An aqueous solution containing 2 g of glucose and 2 g of fructose per 100 g of solution contains 2/100=2% glucose on a wet basis, but 2/4=50% glucose on a dry basis.  If the solution had contained 2 g of glucose and 3 g of fructose, it would still have contained 2% glucose on a wet basis, but only 2/5=40% glucose on a dry basis.

Frequently concentrations are calculated to a dry basis using the moisture (water) content :

In the example above the glucose concentration is 2% as is and the moisture content is 96%.

References

Analytical chemistry